Qaleh Sharhan (also Romanized as Qal‘eh Sharḩān; also known as Qal‘eh Sharḩāl) is a village in Abdoliyeh-ye Gharbi Rural District, in the Central District of Ramshir County, Khuzestan Province, Iran. At the 2006 census, its population was 56, in 9 families.

References 

Populated places in Ramshir County